Sepak takraw was contested at the 1994 Asian Games in Saeki Ward Sports Center, Hiroshima, Japan by men from October 12 to October 15, 1994.

Medalists

Results

Preliminary round

Group A

Group B

5th place match

Knockout round

Semifinals

Bronze medal match

Final

References 

 New Straits Times, October 12–16, 1994
Results

External links 
 Olympic Council of Asia

1994 Asian Games events
1994